GIG Mobility (GIGM, formerly God is Good Motors) is an African Mobility company, founded and headquartered in Nigeria. GIGM currently operates in Nigeria and Ghana, West Africa. It was established in 1998 and is known for moving thousands of commuters daily across Nigeria and Ghana.

History 
GIG Mobility, then God is Good Motors, was founded by the enterprising couple Edwin and Stella Ajaere in 1998 to provide bus services across Nigerian cities. Their son, Chidi Ajaere, took over administration of the company which led to a reinvention of the business in 2010. 

Since becoming GIG Mobility, the company has also seen a number of structural adjustments and has spun off a number of services powered by technology.

In 2019, GIGM expanded outside Nigeria and launched in Ghana with operating terminals in Accra and Kumasi, two of the country's business enclaves. In February 2020, GIGM's interface hinted at the launch of an intra-city transport service that would be technology-powered, called Danfo.

Timeline
 The company launched in 1998 as God is Good Motors
 Renamed to GIGM.com in 2015 and launched online booking
 Launched a mobile app in 2016
 Changed name to GIG Mobility in 2019
 Expanded to Ghana in 2019

Services
GIGM operates an app which allows people to book bus tickets, hire vehicles and opt for pickup service online and is available for iOS and Android users. Customers are able to book trips to any of the cities GIGM visits.

References 

Transport companies of Nigeria
Bus transport in Nigeria
1998 establishments in Nigeria
Transport companies established in 1998